Variable-pitch propeller can refer to: 

Variable-pitch propeller (marine)
Variable-pitch propeller (aeronautics)